The men's 3000 metres steeplechase event at the 1970 Summer Universiade was held at the Stadio Comunale in Turin on 4 and 5 September 1970.

Medalists

Results

Heats

Final

References

Athletics at the 1970 Summer Universiade
1970